Abby Marie Sargent (née Teare; born 25 May 1977 in Melbourne, Australia) is a retired Australian netball player. Sargent was also a member of the England national team that played in the 2002 and 2006 Commonwealth Games. She also played for the Melbourne Kestrels (1999–2000) and the Melbourne Phoenix (2007) in the Commonwealth Bank Trophy. With the start of the ANZ Championship, Sargent played for the Melbourne Vixens in the 2008 season, after which she announced her retirement from netball. She held an Australian Institute of Sport scholarship from 1997–1998.

References

External links 
 

1977 births
Living people
Australian netball players
English netball players
Netball players from Melbourne
Australian Institute of Sport netball players
Melbourne Phoenix players
Melbourne Vixens players
Commonwealth Games bronze medallists for Australia
Commonwealth Games medallists in netball
Netball players at the 2006 Commonwealth Games
AENA Super Cup players
Melbourne Kestrels players
Sydney Sandpipers players
Australian expatriate netball people in England
Medallists at the 2006 Commonwealth Games